The Óbuda University, named after Óbuda, a part of Budapest, is a technical university in Budapest, Hungary. It was founded in 2000 as Budapest Tech  with the merging of three polytechnical institutes (Bánki Donát Technical College, Kandó Kálmán Technical College, Light Industry Technical College). With more than 15,000 students it is one of the largest technical universities in the country. Having complied with the requirements, the institution was promoted to university status on 1 January 2010 under the name of Óbuda University.

Faculties
The university with the merger of former polytechnic institutions has founded the following faculties:
 Alba Regia Technical Faculty (Székesfehérvár)
 Bánki Donát Faculty of Mechanical and Safety Engineering
 Kandó Kálmán Faculty of Electrical Engineering
 Keleti Károly Faculty of Business and Management
 John von Neumann Faculty of Informatics
 Rejtő Sándor Faculty of Light Industry and Environmental Engineering
 Ybl Miklós Faculty of Architecture and Civil Engineering

Doctoral schools
 Applied Informatics and Applied Mathematics
 Safety and Security Sciences
 Materials Sciences and Technologies

Notable alumni 
 Joseph Galamb - Designer of Ford Model T
 Charles Balough - President of the Hercules Motor Manufacturing Company, designer of Ford T-model
 Júlia Sebestyén - European figure skating champion
 Attila Ferjáncz - Hungarian rally driver, Hungarian champion, sports director
 Imre Gedővári - Hungarian fencer and Olympic gold medalist, sports director
 Lajos Boros - radio presenter, journalist, author and singer
 Rudolf Emil Kálmán - electrical engineer, mathematician, inventor of Kálmán filter
 George Andrew Olah - chemist
 Anita Benes - designer, founder of Daalarna
 Péter Márki-Zay - politician, marketer, economist, electrical engineer, historian
 Konrád Nagy -  speed skater and former short track speed skater
 Péter Galambos -  rower
 Anita Köböl - television presenter

External links
The official website of Óbuda University
The MassVentil Project: by Óbuda University{
  "type": "FeatureCollection",
  "features": [
    {
      "type": "Feature",
      "properties": {},
      "geometry": {
        "type": "Point",
        "coordinates": [
          19.034588,
          47.533863
        ]
      }
    },
    {
      "type": "Feature",
      "properties": {},
      "geometry": {
        "type": "Point",
        "coordinates": [
          19.033568,
          47.533445
        ]
      }
    },
    {
      "type": "Feature",
      "properties": {},
      "geometry": {
        "type": "Point",
        "coordinates": [
          19.093517,
          47.507813
        ]
      }
    },
    {
      "type": "Feature",
      "properties": {},
      "geometry": {
        "type": "Point",
        "coordinates": [
          19.07831,
          47.490846
        ]
      }
    },
    {
      "type": "Feature",
      "properties": {},
      "geometry": {
        "type": "Point",
        "coordinates": [
          19.077821,
          47.490795
        ]
      }
    },
    {
      "type": "Feature",
      "properties": {},
      "geometry": {
        "type": "Point",
        "coordinates": [
          19.078197,
          47.491252
        ]
      }
    },
    {
      "type": "Feature",
      "properties": {},
      "geometry": {
        "type": "Point",
        "coordinates": [
          19.034967,
          47.533478
        ]
      }
    },
    {
      "type": "Feature",
      "properties": {},
      "geometry": {
        "type": "Point",
        "coordinates": [
          18.429182,
          47.192866
        ]
      }
    },
    {
      "type": "Feature",
      "properties": {},
      "geometry": {
        "type": "Point",
        "coordinates": [
          18.419208,
          47.188816
        ]
      }
    }
  ]
}

References

Universities in Budapest
Óbuda
Educational institutions established in 1879
1870s establishments in Hungary